The 2015 America East men's lacrosse tournament was the 16th edition of the America East Conference men's lacrosse tournament and took place from April 30 to May 2 that year at John Fallon Field in Albany, New York, United States. The winner of the tournament received the America East Conference's automatic bid to the 2015 NCAA Division I Men's Lacrosse Championship. Four teams from the America East conference will compete in the single elimination tournament. The seeds were based upon the teams' regular season conference record.

Standings
Only the top four teams in the America East conference advanced to the America East Conference Tournament.

Schedule

Bracket
John Fallon Field - Albany, New York

 denotes an overtime game

External links
Americaeast.com
Americaeast.com
Americaeast.com

America East
America East Men's Lacrosse
America East Conference men's lacrosse
Lacrosse